Chao Gai, nicknamed "Pagoda-Shifting Heavenly King", is a fictional character in Water Margin, one of the Four Great Classical Novels of Chinese literature. He is not one of the 108 Stars of Destiny because he dies before the Grand Assembly of the 108 Stars. However, after his death, he serves as a spiritual guardian of the outlaws, who from time to time dedicate ceremonial sacrifices to him.

Background
Chao Gai earned his nickname "Pagoda-Shifting Heavenly King" after carrying a pagoda miniature from the west side of a creek to the east, where his village stood, to deter malevolent spirits. His fellows commonly refer to him as "Heavenly King Chao". Born in a wealthy family, he serves as the baozheng (保正; a chief of a village with 500 households) of Dongxi Village (東溪村; "Eastern Creek Village") in Yuncheng County, Shandong. Apart from having a wide network of friends and acquaintances throughout the jianghu, he also maintains close friendships with the local chief constables Zhu Tong and Lei Heng.

Robbing the convoy of birthday gifts
When Chao Gai's friend Liu Tang receives news that a convoy escorting some birthday gifts for the Imperial Tutor Cai Jing will be passing by Dongxi Village, he wants to rob the convoy and plans to get Chao Gai to help him. During his journey to Dongxi Village, he gets drunk and falls asleep in a rundown temple. Lei Heng, who passes by the temple, suspects that Liu Tang is a fugitive so he arrests him. Along the way back to the county office, Lei Heng decides to visit Chao Gai and take a break at Dongxi Village. While Lei Heng is enjoying the village's hospitality, Chao Gai surreptitiously meets Liu Tang and finds out what happened. He then lies to Lei Heng that Liu Tang is a distant relative and gets Lei Heng to release Liu Tang.

Chao Gai forms a team of seven to rob the convoy. They disguise themselves as date traders and, with Bai Sheng's help, trick the escorts into consuming wine spiked with drugs that will make them unconscious. Once the unsuspecting escorts are knocked out, Chao Gai and his friends escape with the birthday gifts. After the incident, the authorities order the constable He Tao to track down and arrest the robbers. Bai Sheng carelessly reveals his role in the robbery and ends up being arrested. Despite being tortured, Bai Sheng refuses to name his accomplices even though He Tao already knows that Chao Gai is one of them.

Joining Liangshan
Song Jiang secretly warns Chao Gai and his friends that they are wanted by the authorities, and advises them to flee immediately. In the meantime, the local magistrate assigns Zhu Tong and Lei Heng to lead soldiers to arrest Chao Gai and his friends. However, after considering their friendship with Chao Gai, the two chief constables secretly help him and his friends escape.

After defeating the soldiers sent to arrest them, Chao Gai and his friends retreat to Liangshan Marsh and join the outlaw band there. Wang Lun, the outlaw chief, feels that Chao Gai and his friends pose a threat to him so he tries to send them away with gifts and excuses. During this time, Wu Yong instigates Lin Chong, who is already unhappy with Wang Lun, to kill Wang Lun. Chao Gai then becomes the new chief of the Liangshan outlaw band.

Throughout his tenure as Liangshan's chief, Chao Gai hardly participates in battles against Liangshan's enemies. For the most part, he lets Song Jiang lead Liangshan forces into battle while he remains behind to guard their base and provide reinforcements.

Death and legacy
On one occasion, the Zeng brothers of the Zeng Family Fortress rob a precious steed from Duan Jingzhu, who originally intended to present it as a gift to Chao Gai. The Zengs have all along been hostile towards Liangshan and have put up slogans around their fortress to insult Liangshan's leaders. After the Zengs ambushed and injured Liu Tang for no apparent reason, Chao Gai can no longer stand their provocations and decides to personally lead Liangshan forces to attack the fortress and teach the Zengs a lesson.

During a battle against the Zeng forces, Chao Gai gets hit in the forehead by an arrow coated with poison. The arrow was fired by Shi Wengong, the martial arts instructor in the fortress. Chao Gai dies of poisoning shortly afterwards. Before his death, he says: "Whoever captures Shi Wengong and avenges me shall become the next chief of Liangshan". Although Lu Junyi turns out to be the one who defeats and captures Shi Wengong, Song Jiang ultimately succeeds Chao Gai as Liangshan's chief when Lu Junyi and the other outlaw chieftains insist that Song Jiang be their leader.

Chao Gai's character is entirely consistent with the ideas presented in the Liangshan outlaws' manifesto: "delivering justice on Heaven's behalf". His personal history as an official-turned-outlaw also portends the Liangshan way of life and their subsequent methods of recruiting members who previously served in the government.

See also
 List of Water Margin minor characters#Chao Gai's story for a list of supporting minor characters from Chao Gai's story.

References
 
 
 
 
 
 
 

Fictional characters from Shandong